The Upajjhatthana Sutta ("Subjects for Contemplation"), also known as the Abhiṇhapaccavekkhitabbaṭhānasutta in the Chaṭṭha Saṅgāyana Tipiṭaka, is a Buddhist discourse (Pali: sutta; Skt.: sutra) famous for its inclusion of five remembrances, five facts regarding life's fragility and our true inheritance.  The discourse advises that these facts are to be reflected upon often by all.

According to this discourse, contemplation of these facts leads to the abandonment of destructive attachments and actions and to the cultivation of factors necessary for Awakening. According to the Ariyapariyesana Sutta (Discourse on the Noble Quest) MN 26, the first three remembrances are the very insights that led Gautama Buddha to renounce his royal household status and become an ascetic after experiencing strong feelings of spiritual urgency (saṃvega).

As the 57th discourse of the fifth book of the Pali Canon's Anguttara Nikaya (AN), this discourse's abbreviated designation is AN 5.57 or AN V.57.  Alternately, it may be designated as A iii 71 to signify that in the Pali Text Society's Anguttara Nikaya's third volume, this discourse starts on page 71.

Five remembrances
Below are two English translations and the original Pali text of the "five remembrances":

The Buddha advised: "These are the five facts that one should reflect on often, whether one is a woman or a man, lay or ordained."

Since the Buddha redefined kamma as intention in the Nibbedhika Sutta, intention or intentionally committed actions may be better translations of kamma in the last recollection.

Rationale and contemplation
In this discourse, the Buddha explains that the rationale for contemplating (paccavekkhato) the first three facts is to weaken or overcome conceit (mada) in youth, in good health and in being alive; the fourth contemplation is to weaken or overcome lust (rāga); and, the fifth contemplation is to weaken or overcome irresponsibility embodied in improper (duccarita) acts, speech and thoughts.  Thus, by contemplating these facts, the Noble Eightfold Path (anchored in right understanding, conduct and effort) is cultivated and spiritual fetters are abandoned.

One reflects upon (paṭisañcikkhati) each of these facts in the following manner:

Related canonical discourses
Two central Buddhist concepts highlighted in this discourse and echoed throughout Buddhist scriptures are: personal suffering (dukkha) associated with aging, illness and death; and, a natural ethical system based on mental, verbal and physical action (Pali: kamma; Skt.: karma).

Dhammacakkappavattana Sutta (SN 56.11)
In the Buddha's first discourse, Dhammacakkappavattana Sutta (SN 56.11), the Buddha is recorded as defining "suffering" (dukkha) in a manner that incorporates the first four remembrances: "Birth is suffering, aging is suffering, sickness is suffering, death is suffering, association with the unpleasant is suffering, dissociation from the pleasant is suffering, not to receive what one desires is suffering...."  This formula is reiterated throughout the Pali Canon.

Sukumāla Sutta (AN 3.38)
The first three remembrances are antidotes to the "threefold pride" of youthfulness (yobbana-mada), health (ārogya-mada) and life (jīvita-mada). Nyanaponika & Bodhi (1999) note:

The Sukumāla Sutta (AN 3.38) illustrates the bodhisatta's early  insights.  For instance, in this discourse, the Buddha is recording as having observed:

Devadūta Sutta (MN 130 & AN 3.35)
In the Devadūta Sutta (MN 130), King Yama, the righteous god of death, in judging a newly deceased person's destination, asks whether or not the person has seen and reflected upon five "divine messengers" (devadūta).  These five are:
 a newly born, defenseless infant
 a bent over, broken-toothed old person (aging)
 a suffering ill person (illness)
 a punished criminal
 a dead person (death)
Regarding each of these, Yama would query:

In the similarly named sutta AN 3.35, Yama's interrogation is reduced to addressing the three universal conditions of aging, illness and death.

Dasadhamma Sutta (AN 10.48)
In the Dasadhamma Sutta (AN 10.48), the Buddha identifies "ten things" (dasa dhamma) that renunciates (pabbajita) should reflect on often:
 "I have become casteless"
 "My life is dependent on others"
 "My behavior should be different [from that of householders]"
 "Can I fault myself with regard to my virtue?"
 "Can my knowledgeable fellows in the holy life, on close examination, fault me with regard to my virtue?"
 "I will grow different, separate from all that is dear & appealing to me"
 "I am the owner of my actions (kamma), heir to my actions, born of my actions, related through my actions, and have my actions as my arbitrator. Whatever I do, for good or for evil, to that will I fall heir"
 "What am I becoming as the days & nights fly past?"
 "Do I delight in an empty dwelling?"
 "Have I attained a superior human attainment, a truly noble distinction of knowledge & vision, such that – when my fellows in the holy life question me in the last days of my life – I won't feel abashed?"

As can be readily seen, this list retains the fourth and fifth remembrances of the Upajjhatthana Sutta as its sixth and seventh contemplations.

Cula-kammavibhanga Sutta (MN 135)
In the Cula-kammavibhanga Sutta (MN 135), the Buddha is asked to elaborate on his statement:

The Buddha responds in the context of the Buddhist notion of rebirth.  He identifies that killing or  physically harming living beings, or being ill-tempered or envious or uncharitable to monastics or stubborn or uncurious about the teachings leads to inferior rebirths; while abstaining from these actions (kamma) leads to superior rebirths. The Buddha summarizes:

Alternate titles
Some alternate titles for the Upajjhatthana Sutta are based on this discourse's opening words (in English and Pali):

In general,  (pl. ) can be translated as "abode" or "state" or "condition." In the above translation, Thanissaro (1997b) translates  as "fact."

In addition, based on the discourse's fourth and fifth Pali words, the Pali-language  edition is entitled, .  Upalavanna (n.d.) translates this into English as, "Should be constantly reflected upon." 

Furthermore, Nyanaponika & Bodhi (1999) provide this discourse with the English-language title, "Five Contemplations for Everyone."

See also 
 Pāli Canon
 Sutta Piṭaka
 Anguttara Nikāya
 Majjhima Nikāya
 Samyutta Nikaya
 Dhammacakkappavattana Sutta
 Samaññaphala Sutta
 Four Noble Truths
 Noble Eightfold Path
 Patikulamanasikara
 Jarāmaraṇa
 Anussati

Notes

Sources
 Bodhi, Bhikkhu (ed.) (2005). In the Buddha's Words: An Anthology of Discourses from the Pāli Canon. Boston: Wisdom Pubs. .
 Bodhgaya News (n.d.). Pali Canon Online Database. Available at http://www.bodhgayanews.net/pali.htm.
  Thera (trans.) (1994). Cula-kammavibhanga Sutta: The Shorter Exposition of Kamma (MN 135). Retrieved 31 Aug 2007 from "Access to Insight" at http://www.accesstoinsight.org/tipitaka/mn/mn.135.nymo.html.
 , Bhikkhu (trans.) & Bhikkhu Bodhi (ed.) (2001). The Middle-Length Discourses of the Buddha: A Translation of the Majjhima Nikāya. Boston: Wisdom Publications. .
 Nyanaponika Thera & Bhikkhu Bodhi (1999). Numerical Discourses of the Buddha: An Anthology of Suttas from the Anguttara Nikaya. Walnut Creek, CA: Altamira Press. .
 Piyadassi Thera (trans.) (1999). Dhammacakkappavattana Sutta: Setting in Motion the Wheel of Truth (SN 56.11). Retrieved 30 Aug 2007 from "Access to Insight" at http://www.accesstoinsight.org/tipitaka/sn/sn56/sn56.011.piya.html.
 Rhys Davids, T.W. & William Stede (eds.) (1921-5). The Pali Text Society’s Pali–English Dictionary. Chipstead: Pali Text Society. A general on-line search engine for the PED is available at http://dsal.uchicago.edu/dictionaries/pali/.
 Sri Lanka Tripitaka Project (SLTP) (n.d.).  (AN 5.6). Retrieved 29 Aug 2007 from "MettaNet - Lanka" at http://www.metta.lk/tipitaka/2Sutta-Pitaka/4Anguttara-Nikaya/Anguttara3/5-pancakanipata/006-nivaranavaggo-p.html.
 Thanissaro Bhikkhu (trans.) (1994). Dasadhamma Sutta: Ten Things (AN 10.48).  Retrieved 31 Aug 2007 from "Access to Insight" at http://www.accesstoinsight.org/tipitaka/an/an10/an10.048.than.html.
 Thanissaro Bhikkhu (trans.) (1997a). Sukhamala Sutta: Refinement (AN 3.38).  Retrieved 29 Aug 2007 from "Access to Insight" at http://www.accesstoinsight.org/tipitaka/an/an03/an03.038.than.html.
 Thanissaro Bhikkhu (trans.) (1997b). Upajjhatthana Sutta: Subjects for Contemplation (AN 5.57).  Retrieved 3 Oct 2006 from "Access to Insight" at http://www.accesstoinsight.org/tipitaka/an/an05/an05.057.than.html.
 Upalavanna, Sister (trans.) (n.d.). Nīvaranavaggo (AN 5:6). Retrieved 29 Aug 2007 from "MettaNet - Lanka" at http://www.metta.lk/tipitaka/2Sutta-Pitaka/4Anguttara-Nikaya/Anguttara3/5-pancakanipata/006-nivaranavaggo-e.html.

External links 
 Upajjhatthana Sutta read aloud

Anguttara Nikaya